The Great Seal of the State of Illinois is the official emblem of the U.S. state, and signifies the official nature of a document produced by the state of Illinois. The flag of the state of Illinois consists of the seal of Illinois on a white background, with the word "Illinois" underneath the seal.  The present seal was adopted in 1869, the flag bearing the central elements of the seal was adopted in 1915, and the word Illinois was added to the flag in 1970. In a 2001 survey by the North American Vexillological Association, the flag of Illinois was ranked 49th out of 72 different flags of states and territories, mainly in the US and Canada.

Design

The current flag depicts the Great Seal of Illinois, which was originally designed in 1819 and emulated the Great Seal of the United States. In the eagle's beak there is a banner with the state motto, "State Sovereignty, National Union."  The dates on the seal, 1818 and 1868, represent the year Illinois became a state and the year in which the Great Seal was redesigned by Sharon Tyndale. Although "State Sovereignty" comes first in the motto, "State" is at the bottom and "Sovereignty" is upside-down.

It is one of eight U.S. state flags to feature an eagle, alongside those of Iowa, Michigan, New York, North Dakota, Oregon, Pennsylvania and Utah.

Seal history
The first Great Seal of the State of Illinois was adopted in 1819 by the first Illinois General Assembly. The first law authorizing the Great Seal required the secretary of state of Illinois to procure and keep the seal. The first seal engraved was essentially a copy of the Great Seal of the United States. It was used until 1839, when it was recut. The seal designed in 1839 became the Second Great Seal.

Illinois Secretary of State Sharon Tyndale spearheaded the drive to create a third state seal for Illinois. In 1867, he asked State Senator Allen C. Fuller to introduce legislation requiring a new seal, and suggested to Fuller that the words of the state motto be reversed, from "State Sovereignty, National Union", to "National Union, State Sovereignty". However, the bill passed by the legislature on March 7, 1867, kept the original wording. Despite declining his suggestion, the legislature nonetheless entrusted Tyndale with designing the new seal. And Tyndale managed to (literally) twist the legislature's intent; he kept the words in the correct order on the banner, but the banner twists, so the word "Sovereignty" is upside down, arguably making it less readable.

Tyndale's seal features a bald eagle pitched on a rock carrying a shield in its talons and a banner with the state motto in its beak. Thirteen stars and thirteen stripes on the shield represent the original thirteen states of the Union. The date August 26, 1818, when Illinois's first constitution was adopted in Kaskaskia, appears along the bottom arc of the circle, and 1818, the year of statehood, displays on the seal below 1868, the year the current seal was adopted. This basic design has survived through several minor modifications since it was first conceived. The Illinois secretary of state is still the keeper of the Great Seal of the State of Illinois.

Flag history

Initial adoption, 1915
During her time as state regent of the Daughters of the American Revolution (DAR) in 1912, Ella Park Lawrence began a campaign to have Illinois adopt a state flag.  She was unsuccessful during her time as state regent, but continued to lobby members of the Illinois General Assembly to adopt a state flag as a member of the Rockford chapter of the DAR.  On April 1, 1914, Lawrence sent a letter to every Illinois chapter of the DAR announcing a contest to design an Illinois state flag, with the winner receiving a prize of $25.  Thirty-five designs were submitted in response to this contest.

The contest was judged by a panel chaired by Lewis Stevenson, Illinois Secretary of State. They selected the design of Lucy Derwent. The flag became the official state banner on July 6, 1915, following its passage in the Illinois State House and Senate.  Governor Edward F. Dunne did not sign the bill, but he did not veto it.

1969 alterations
In the 1960s, Chief Petty Officer Bruce McDaniel petitioned to have the name of the state added to the flag. He noted that many of the people with whom he served during the Vietnam War did not recognize the banner. Governor Richard B. Ogilvie signed the addition to the flag into law on September 17, 1969, and the new flag, designed by Sanford (Florence) Hutchinson, became official on July 1, 1970.

Illinois Centennial design 

For Illinois's first 100 years of statehood in 1918, Wallace Rice, who designed Chicago's flag, designed a centennial flag for the state. It had three horizontal bands of equal width alternating white, blue, white. It was charged with 21 stars along the edge of the hoist. There were 10 blue stars in the upper white band and 10 in the lower white band, representing the 10 northern and 10 southern states at the time of Illinois' statehood in 1818. The center blue band had one large, white star for the state of Illinois itself.

Illinois Bicentennial design
On January 12, 2017, the state unveiled a logo in preparation for the state's bicentennial the following year.  The logo, designed by Ben Olsen, features a blue silhouette of the state with the word ILLINOIS above.  In the center of the silhouette, is a sunburst effect with the number 200 in gold.  Along the right side is the word Bicentennial also in gold from bottom to top and beneath are the dates 1818 and 2018. This is all surrounded by 21 gold stars denoting Illinois position as the twenty-first state.  Executive Director of the Bicentennial Office, Stewart Layne, added, "The sunburst in the middle of the state outline portrays the impact Illinois has made on the country and the world over the past two centuries and the bright future we aspire to for the next 200 years."

Government seals of Illinois

See also

 Illinois Centennial half dollar
 Symbols of Illinois

References

External links
The Great Seal of the State of Illinois
Illinois State Flag 

Illinois
Illinois
Illinois
Illinois
Symbols of Illinois
Illinois
Illinois
Illinois